Wilder Park is home to West Texas A&M baseball. The field is made entirely of astroturf and the home dugout is directly connected to the team clubhouse which has a coach's office, laundry facility, and a team meeting locker room. The facility was named in honor of David and Myrt Wilder of Plainview, Texas, who donated $200,000 for the facility to be built.

References

Baseball venues in Texas